The Essex Olympian Football League is a football competition based in England, founded in the 1966–67 season. It has a total of six senior divisions and one under 21 division. The Premier Division sits at step 7 (or level 11) of the National League System and it is a feeder to Division One South of the Eastern Counties Football League. Between 1986 and 2005, the league was known as the Essex Intermediate League.

Clubs to progress up the pyramid from the league include Billericay Town, Brentwood Town, Bowers United, Sawbridgeworth Town, Burnham Ramblers, Hullbridge Sports and Great Wakering Rovers.

The clubs that finish in the top three of the Colchester & East Essex League, Romford & District League or the Southend Borough & District Combination can apply to join the lowest level of the Essex Olympian League.

History
In 1966, the Essex Olympian Football League was founded, following a meeting at the Saracens Head pub in Chelmsford. The first league constitution consisted of Basildon & Pitsea, Billericay Town, Bishop's Stortford Swifts, Bowers United, Burnham Ramblers, Collier Row, Dorstel Press, Dunmow, Little Waltham, Old Chelmsfordians and Sawbridgeworth, with Burnham Ramblers winning the first edition of the Essex Olympian League, finishing four points above Little Waltham. Little Waltham left the league at the end of the inaugural 1966–67 season, with British Mathews, Critalls, Essex County Council Staff and Manor Athletic all joining to take the constitution up to 16 clubs. In 1981, a Second Division was added with eight clubs (Baddow Royals, Basildon Sports, Caribbean International Sports, Chigwell Villa, Civil Service Olympian, Cossor Sports, Ekco and Rayleigh Athletic) joining the league system.

In 1986, the league was renamed to the Essex Intermediate League, adding a Division Three three years later.

In 2005, the league renamed itself back to its original Essex Olympian League name. In 2008, Takeley moved up the pyramid into the Essex Senior League. Before then the Olympian League had not sent a club to the Essex Senior League for over a decade, causing the Essex Senior League to look elsewhere in Essex for new member clubs, including lower leagues and leagues outside the National League System such as the now-defunct Essex Business Houses Football League. Clubs from this league have previously been able to jump straight into the Essex Senior League due to the facilities at which they play, not where they finished in the Essex Business Houses League. The following year, in 2009, a Division Three was added, taking the number of leagues administered by the Essex Olympian League up to four. In 2015, two more leagues were added to the system, being named Division Four and Division Five. In 2017, The Football Association announced a step 6 (level 10) division for Essex and East Anglia in the Eastern Counties Football League to start playing in the 2018–19 season, meaning the Essex Olympian League would drop to step 7 in Non-league. In March 2020, as a result of the COVID-19 pandemic, the Football Association announced all leagues from step 3 to 7 on the National League System would be cancelled, with all results being expunged. In November 2020, the Essex Olympian League was suspended, owing to a second wave of COVID-19 in the United Kingdom. The league was eventually resumed in April 2021, becoming one of the only leagues in England to resume play after the suspension in November 2020. Buckhurst Hill were promoted at the end of the 2020–21 season, after winning the Premier Division, gaining promotion to the Eastern Counties League Division One South.

Members for the 2022–23 season
Source:

Premier Division
Bishop's Stortford Swifts
Canning Town
Catholic United
Galleywood
Hutton
Kelvedon Hatch
Leigh Ramblers
Old Southendians
Rayleigh Town
Runwell Sports
Shenfield
Springfield
Sungate
Toby

Division One
ACD United
Beacon Hill Rovers
Corinthians
Epping Town
Harold Hill
Harold Wood Athletic
Herongate Athletic
Leigh Town
Manford Way
Old Chelmsfordians
Wakering Sports

Division Two
AS Rawreth
Catholic United Reserves
Harold Wood Athletic Reserves
Hashtag United Development
Hutton Reserves
May & Baker 'A'
Old Southendian Reserves
Rayleigh Town Reserves
Shoebury Town
Wakebury
Wakering Sports Reserves

Division Three
Basildon Town Reserves
Buckhurst Hill U23
Chingford Athletic Reserves
Corinthians Reserves
Hullbridge Sports Reserves
Leigh Town Reserves
Old Chelmsfordians Reserves
Pitsea Athletic
Rochford Town
Springfield Reserves
Toby Reserves

Division Four
Bishop's Stortford Swifts Reserves
Collier Row
Galleywood Reserves
Herongate Athletic Reserves
Leigh Ramblers Reserves
Leytonstone United
Ongar Town
Pitsea Athletic Reserves
Roydon
Shenfield Reserves
Wakering Sports 'A'

Division Five
AS Rawreth Reserves
Basildon Town 'A'
Canning Town Reserves
Collier Row Reserves
Epping Town Reserves
Manford Way Reserves
Old Barkabbeyans
Runwell Sports Reserves
Shoebury Town Reserves
Sungate Reserves
Wakebury Reserves

Past champions

1966–81
The league originally consisted of a single section of 13 clubs, reaching a peak of 18 clubs by 1969–70.

1981–89
In 1981, a second division was added. The league ran with two divisions for nine years. During this period, the league was renamed the Essex Intermediate League in 1986.

1989–2007
In 1989, a third division was added. The league reverted to its original name, the Essex Olympian League in 2005.

2007 to date
In 2007 the divisions were renamed Premier, One and Two.

In 2010 a Division Three was added.

In 2013 an Under 21 Division was added.

In 2015 the two reserve divisions were promoted to senior status and renamed Divisions Four and Five, along with the three higher divisions, leaving just one Under-21 division below that.

References

External links
 

 
Football in Essex
1966 establishments in England
Football leagues in England
Sports leagues established in 1966